Howard Tucker (born July 10, 1922) is an American neurologist who has been practicing medicine since 1947. In addition to becoming a lawyer and passing the Ohio Bar Examination at age 67 in 1989, Tucker is recognized by Guinness World Records as the current oldest practicing doctor.

Early life and education 
Howard Tucker was born in Cleveland, Ohio. Tucker decided to pursue a career in medicine while attending Cleveland Heights High School. After graduating high school in 1940, Tucker attended Ohio State University for his undergraduate studies and Ohio State University College of Medicine for his Doctor of Medicine degree.

Tucker enlisted in the United States Navy during World War II and would later serve as Chief of Neurology for the Atlantic Fleet during the Korean War.

Medical career 
Tucker completed his residency at the Cleveland Clinic and training at the Neurological Institute of New York before returning to Cleveland, where he would practice neurology at University Hospitals Cleveland Medical Center and Hillcrest Hospital for over seven decades. While still practicing neurology, Tucker attended Cleveland State University Cleveland–Marshall College of Law where he received his Juris Doctor degree and passed the Ohio Bar Examination at age 67 in 1989.

In 1960, Tucker was credited with solving a medical case involving two young girls who would go in and out of coma. Tucker determined the cause of the comas to be barbiturate poisoning.

Tucker teaches medical residents at St. Vincent Charity Medical Center and pursues work as an expert witness for various medical-legal cases. In 2021, Tucker was recognized as the oldest practicing doctor by Guinness World Records.

Personal life 
In 1957, Tucker married Sara "Sue" Siegel. As of 2022, 88-year-old Siegel continues to practice medicine as a psychoanalyst. The couple have four children and ten grandchildren.

A feature documentary on Tucker's life and career, What's Next?, is currently in production and is being produced by Tucker's grandson, Austin Tucker, and directed and produced by Taylor Taglianetti.

References

Living people
1922 births
American centenarians
20th-century American physicians
American neurologists
Ohio lawyers
Ohio State University College of Medicine alumni
United States Navy personnel of the Korean War
21st-century American physicians
21st-century American lawyers
20th-century American lawyers
Military personnel from Cleveland
Lawyers from Cleveland
Physicians from Cleveland
Cleveland–Marshall College of Law alumni
United States Navy personnel of World War II
Men centenarians